Bludovice may refer to places in the Moravian-Silesian Region of the Czech Republic:

Bludovice (Havířov), a village and part of the city of Havířov
Horní Bludovice, a municipality and village
Prostřední Bludovice, a village and part of Horní Bludovice